

Belgium
Belgian Congo – Pierre Ryckmans, Governor-General of the Belgian Congo (1934–1946)

France
 French Somaliland – 
 Ange Marie Charles André Bayardelle, Governor of French Somaliland (1942–1943)
 Michel Raphael Antoine Saller, Governor of French Somaliland (1943–1944)
 Guinea – Horace Valentin Crocicchia, Governor of Guinea (1942–1944)

Japan
 Karafuto – 
Masayoshi Ogawa, Governor-General of Karafuto (9 April 1940 – 1 July 1943)
Toshio Ōtsu, Governor-General of Karafuto (1 July 1943 – 11 November 1947)
 Korea – Kuniaki Koiso, Governor-General of Korea (1942–1944)
 Taiwan – Kiyoshi Hasegawa, Governor-General of Taiwan (16 December 1940 – December 1944)

Portugal
 Angola – 
 Álvaro de Freitas Morna, High Commissioner of Angola (1942–1943)
 Manuel Pereira Figueira, High Commissioner of Angola (1943)
 Vasco Lopes Alves, High Commissioner of Angola (1943–1947)

United Kingdom
 Aden – Sir John Hathorn Hall, Governor of Aden (1940–1945)
 Malta Colony – Lord Gort, Governor of Malta (1942–1944)
 Northern Rhodesia – Sir Eubule John Waddington, Governor of Northern Rhodesia (1941–1947)

Colonial governors
Colonial governors
1943